Eupithecia mystiata is a moth in the family Geometridae first described by Samuel E. Cassino in 1925. It is found in the US states of Arizona and California.

The wingspan is about 22 mm. The forewings are deep smoky with little trace of maculation but with a fair-sized discal dot. Adults have been recorded on wing from February to May.

References

Moths described in 1925
mystiata
Moths of North America